Ashington is a hamlet in Dorset, England. It lies within the unitary authority of Bournemouth, Christchurch and Poole, between the villages of Corfe Mullen and Wimborne Minster.

External links

Villages in Dorset
Bournemouth, Christchurch and Poole
Conservation areas in Dorset